Edd William Bowers (September 4, 1922 – September 16, 2008) was an American football and basketball coach. He served as the head football coach at Iowa Wesleyan College in Mount Pleasant, Iowa from 1956 to 1959 and Grinnell College in Grinnell, Iowa from 1960 to 1978, compiling a career college football coaching record of 89–105–2. Bowers was also the head men's basketball coach at Grinnell from 1973 to 1974.

Head coaching record

College football

References

External links
 

1922 births
2008 deaths
Grinnell Pioneers football coaches
Grinnell Pioneers football players
Grinnell Pioneers men's basketball coaches
Iowa Wesleyan Tigers athletic directors
Iowa Wesleyan Tigers football coaches
High school football coaches in Iowa